Alfredo Shahanga (born 14 April 1965) is a retired long-distance runner from Tanzania, who won the 1989 edition of the Vienna Marathon. In the same year he triumphed at the 16th Berlin Marathon on 1 October in a time of 2:10:11. Shahanga represented his native country in the men's marathon at the 1991 World Championships in Tokyo, Japan.

Achievements
All results regarding marathon, unless stated otherwise

External links

References

1965 births
Living people
Tanzanian male long-distance runners
Tanzanian male marathon runners
Place of birth missing (living people)
Berlin Marathon male winners